Moro Alhassan (born 15 January 1994) is a Ghanaian footballer who plays as a defensive midfielder.

Club career
Alhassan was born in Accra, but graduated from Genoa's youth academy, and appeared on the bench with the first-team during the 2012–13 season. On 12 July 2013 he was loaned to Cesena.

On 13 September Alhassan made his professional debut, starting in a 1–2 loss at Palermo.

On 30 August 2015 he was signed by Carrarese.

References

External links
 
 
 

1994 births
Living people
Ghanaian footballers
Footballers from Accra
Association football midfielders
Tudu Mighty Jets FC players
Genoa C.F.C. players
A.C. Cesena players
L.R. Vicenza players
Carrarese Calcio players
Serie B players
Serie C players
Ghanaian expatriate footballers
Expatriate footballers in Italy
Ghanaian expatriate sportspeople in Italy